Larry Selders is an American politician serving as a member of the Louisiana House of Representatives from the 67th district. Elected in November 2020, he assumed on January 13, 2021.

Education 
After graduating from Louisiana State University Laboratory School, Selders earned a Bachelor of Science degree in social work from Southern University.

Career 
Selders served as a commissioner of BREC, the parks and recreation agency in East Baton Rouge Parish, Louisiana. He has also worked in the healthcare industry. Selders was elected to the Louisiana House of Representatives in November 2020 and assumed office on January 13, 2021.

DWI Arrest 
Selders was arrested for DWI, reckless operation, and driving under suspension in the early morning hours of Sunday August 21, 2022. He was accused of speeding and doing burnouts while over the legal limit near the LSU campus, in his legislative district. Selders subsequently issued an apology for the arrest on social media.

References 

Living people
Louisiana State University Laboratory School alumni
Southern University alumni
People from East Baton Rouge Parish, Louisiana
Democratic Party members of the Louisiana House of Representatives
African-American state legislators in Louisiana
21st-century American politicians
Year of birth missing (living people)
21st-century African-American politicians